Micraglossa michaelshafferi is a moth in the family Crambidae. It was described by Wei-Chun Li, Hou-Hun Li and Matthias Nuss in 2010. It is found in China (Anhui, Zhejiang, Guizhou, Guangdong) and Thailand.

Etymology
The species is named in after Mike Shaffer.

References

Moths described in 2010
Scopariinae